The 2002 Mountain West Conference football season was the fourth since eight former members of the Western Athletic Conference banded together to form the Mountain West Conference. Colorado State won the conference championship in 2002, the Rams' third title since the league began in 1999.

Bowl games

In 2002, the Mountain West Conference had four contractual tie-ins with bowl games. In order, the Liberty Bowl, Las Vegas Bowl, San Francisco Bowl and Seattle Bowl had the first through fourth selections of bowl eligible MW teams. However, following the conclusion of the 2002 college football season, only three MW teams had good enough records (six wins or more) to make them eligible for bowl games: Colorado State, New Mexico, and Air Force.

The Liberty Bowl, with the first selection of eligible MW teams, picked the MW champion Colorado State Rams to represent the conference in its 2002 game. The Rams played the TCU Horned Frogs of Conference USA and lost, 17–3. With the second pick, the Las Vegas Bowl selected the New Mexico Lobos. Though New Mexico lost to favored UCLA, 27–13, the Lobos featured the first female player to play in a Division I football game, Katie Hnida. The third bowl with an MW tie-in, the San Francisco Bowl, was thus forced to select the Air Force Academy Falcons, who were the sole remaining bowl-eligible MW team. Facing the Falcons were the Virginia Tech Hokies, who earned a 20–13 victory over the Falcons.

Awards
Coach of the Year: Rocky Long, New Mexico
Offensive Player of the Year: QB Bradlee Van Pelt, Jr, Colorado State
Defensive Player of the Year: CB Jamaal Brimmer, So, UNLV
Freshman of the Year: RB DonTrell Moore, New Mexico

All Conference Team

References